Julius Mutinda (born 14 September 1956) is a Kenyan field hockey player. He competed at the 1984 Summer Olympics in Los Angeles, where the Kenyan team placed ninth. He also competed at the 1988 Summer Olympics in Seoul.

References

External links

1956 births
Living people
Kenyan male field hockey players
Olympic field hockey players of Kenya
Field hockey players at the 1984 Summer Olympics
Field hockey players at the 1988 Summer Olympics
20th-century Kenyan people